Disney Junior – Live on Stage! (originally Playhouse Disney – Live on Stage! until 2011) was a live show attraction featuring puppets of characters from Disney Junior's popular television programs, located at three Disney theme parks: Walt Disney Studios Park at Disneyland Paris, Disney California Adventure at the Disneyland Resort and Disney's Hollywood Studios at the Walt Disney World Resort in Florida.

History

Disney's Hollywood Studios
Prior to Disney Junior – Live on Stage!, the theater was the Soundstage Restaurant from the park's opening date until November 14, 1998; the restaurant featured sets over the years from Big Business, Beauty and the Beast, and Aladdin. Following that, the theater hosted Bear in the Big Blue House – Live on Stage from June 7, 1999, until August 4, 2001.

That show closed to make room for Playhouse Disney – Live on Stage!, which opened on October 1, 2001, featuring returning characters from Bear in the Big Blue House, as well as new characters from Rolie Polie Olie, Stanley, and The Book of Pooh.

In April 2005, the show replaced Rolie Polie Olie with JoJo's Circus. A re-imagined version of Playhouse Disney – Live on Stage! opened in March 2008, with some new characters from Mickey Mouse Clubhouse, Handy Manny, Little Einsteins, and My Friends Tigger & Pooh.

The show was renamed in March 2011, following the rebranding of Playhouse Disney to Disney Junior, replacing My Friends Tigger & Pooh with Jake and the Never Land Pirates. In January 2013, the show replaced both Handy Manny and Little Einsteins, respectively, with Sofia the First and Doc McStuffins, when it was revamped again.

Disney Junior – Live on Stage! closed on September 1st, 2018. On December 21, 2018, the Hollywood Studios version was replaced by a new show named Disney Junior Dance Party! (formerly, Disney Junior Play and Dance in 2020–21), featuring characters from Mickey and the Roadster Racers, Sofia The First (which was eventually replaced by Vampirina), Doc McStuffins, and The Lion Guard.

On October 10, 2020, the show replaced The Lion Guard with Mira, Royal Detective during the takeover.

Disney California Adventure
The California version of the show follows the same pattern as the Florida version. Before Disney Junior – Live on Stage!, the theater was originally home to the ABC Soap Opera Bistro from the park's opening date until November 3, 2002, which featured dining areas that are replicas of the sets from All My Children, One Life to Live, and General Hospital. Due to its unpopularity, however, the restaurant closed to make way for Playhouse Disney – Live on Stage!, which was essentially the 2001 edition from Disney's Hollywood Studios (then known as Disney-MGM Studios), before being updated over the years up until the transition of Playhouse Disney to Disney Junior.

In 2013, the show was updated with segments based on Sofia the First and Doc McStuffins TV series from Disney Junior channel.

On May 26, 2017, the California version was replaced by a new show named Disney Junior Dance Party!, featuring characters from Mickey and the Roadster Racers, Sofia the First, Doc McStuffins, and The Lion Guard.

On October 15, 2021, the show was updated with Vampirina and replaced Sofia the First and The Lion Guard.

Walt Disney Studios Park
When Playhouse Disney – Live on Stage! first opened, it was essentially the 2008 edition from Disney's Hollywood Studios. Despite its name change at the time of the block's rebranding, the show itself had not been updated for unknown reasons. In April 2019, it closed to make way for the new interactive show "Disney Junior Dream Factory", which opened on July 1, 2021.

2011–13 Version
With the name change of Playhouse Disney to Disney Junior, the show also changed its name, this time to Disney Junior – Live on Stage! The My Friends Tigger & Pooh segment was replaced with a segment based on Jake and the Never Land Pirates.

2013–18 Version
The Handy Manny and Little Einsteins segments were replaced with segments based on Sofia the First and Doc McStuffins.

Meet and Greets
Outside the theater at Disney's Hollywood Studios, there are meet-and-greet areas for Pluto and the titular characters from Vampirina, Fancy Nancy and Doc McStuffins.

References

External links

Amusement park attractions introduced in 2001
Amusement park attractions introduced in 2003
Amusement park attractions introduced in 2009
Amusement park attractions that closed in 2019
Amusement park attractions that closed in 2011
Amusement park attractions that closed in 2017
Amusement park attractions introduced in 2011
Amusement park attractions that closed in 2018
Animation Courtyard
Hollywood Land
Production Courtyard (Walt Disney Studios Park)
Walt Disney Parks and Resorts attractions
Walt Disney Parks and Resorts entertainment
2009 establishments in France
2019 disestablishments in France
2001 establishments in Florida
2018 disestablishments in Florida
2003 establishments in California
2017 disestablishments in California
Disney Junior